Pierre Joseph Charpentier (born 28 March 1888, date of death unknown) was a French ice hockey player. He competed in the men's tournaments at the 1920 Summer Olympics and the 1924 Winter Olympics.

References

External links

1888 births
Year of death missing
Ice hockey people from Paris
Ice hockey players at the 1920 Summer Olympics
Ice hockey players at the 1924 Winter Olympics
Olympic ice hockey players of France